Vast is my Native Land (1958), also known as Great is my Country was the first film shot in the Soviet wide-screen film format known as Kinopanorama. The title was taken from the song of the same name by the Russian composer Isaac Dunaevsky, which is featured in the film. The film was directed by Roman Karmen, known for various documentary films produced in the Soviet Union. The music was composed by Kirill Molchanov, a noted composer of music for ballet and opera.

The Sovcolor film, which is 90-minutes in length, was premièred on 28 February 1958 at the Mir Kino Theatre in Moscow. The film was screened throughout the USSR. An edited version of the film was screened In June and July, 1958, at the Mayfair Theatre in New York City in conjunction with Soviet Trade Exhibition at the New York Coliseum.

The film was released in France on 12 May 1961 as Conquerors of the Sea.

External links

New York Times review

1959 films
Soviet documentary films

Soviet propaganda films